Bycyklen is bicycle sharing system of Copenhagen, Denmark. It was launched on 1 April 2014. Unlike its predecessor, Copenhagen City Bikes, this system is not free, but features electric bicycles equipped with a GPS routing device.

See also
Cycling in Copenhagen
Utility cycling
Segregated cycle facilities
Modal share

External links
 Bycyklen website

Cycling in Copenhagen
Utility cycling
Community bicycle programs
2014 establishments in Denmark
Bicycle sharing in Denmark